Lenca mythology is the set of religious and mythological beliefs of the Lenca people from Honduras and El Salvador, before and after the conquest of America. The pre-Columbian era developed a diverse mythology across the americas, however little has been rescued due to the oblivion that this town remained during the colonization and the adoption of the Catholic faith after the 16th century.

Myths

Creation of man 
According to the original Lenca polytheistic religion, the creation of man is thanks to a deity known as "Maraguana", she brought the dust of the  stars to earth, and when she arrived there she collected the dry grains of corn and cocoa beans, and in a grinding stone and a clay pot, he molded a creature different from the others on earth created by the gods, this endowed it with consciousness and intelligence and thus made the first human being. The place called "Ti Ketau Antawinikil" Some time later this deity created another human known as "Ti wanatuku", he was born from an egg, which was hatched in a bird's nest on the head of the first human being. Both are considered the ancestors of modern humans.

Comizahual 
The legend of the Comizahual (or Comizahuatl) speaks of a matriarch that is said to have appeared around more than two hundred years before the conquest of America, possibly at the end of the 13th century, which is represented with a zoomorphic figure similar to a jaguar and in her human form she is represented as a woman with white skin and hair, she is described as a skilled person as a warrior and wise as a leader. This woman guided and taught some new knowledge about agriculture and warfare to the Lencas that they began to implement during the following years during the post classic mesoamerican period. Fulfilled his mission, he distributed the lands among three men according to some versions these were his sons, in others his brothers, to whom he left instructions for the treatment of his vassals, after that, the matriarch disappeared.

Within those described about the Comizahual physique, some interpreted that the description was a white person, who arrived on the continent, being a pre-Columbian contact between Europeans and Americans before the Spanish arrival, similar to that of the Viking explorers with the natives of what today it is Canada, or the theory of Roman contact with Mesoamerica.Although there is little evidence of the arrival of Europeans in what is modern day Central america before Columbus. Most academics have said that it is believed that it could be the interpretation of a person with albinism.

Deities 

The Lencan religion, similar to those of the rest of the Mesoamerican area, had a number of deities in its pantheon of several gods, however few detailed records survived on all of them as well as on the native Lenca faith, however some of those that are registered are:

Itanipuca 
Considered to be the main deity of the Lenca people, he was known as "the great father", related to the sky and the movement of the stars possibly also related to astronomy, for the Mesoamerican peoples this element was important within their cosmology, due to this, it is considered the main Lenca deity. It could have parallelism with other Mesoamerican deities such as Huitzilopochtli or Tecaztlipoca.

Ilanguipuca 
Known as the "Great Mother", couple of Itanipuca, she is related to the land, its forests, rivers, and lakes, she is also with the fertility of the crops, she along with Itanipuca are the creators of the world.

Icelaca 
He was another important deity because he was related to the change of the seasons, the winds, and meteorological phenomena, he was credited with the existence of events such as hurricanes and thunder storms, he was also known as "the lord of time", this being has certain parallels with the Mayan god Chaac or the Mexica Tlaloc.

Managuara 
Its main role is unknown, but it is noted that it was representative of knowledge, it is the deity responsible for the creation of Man, thus endowing him with consciousness. It could have parallels with the Mayan Kukulkan or Mexica Quetzalcoatl.

See also 

 History of Honduras
 History of El Salvador

References 

History of Honduras
History of El Salvador
Mesoamerican mythology and religion
Archaeological sites in Honduras